The Asiatic short-tailed shrew (Blarinella quadraticauda) is one of three species of shrew in the genus Blarinella. It is in the family Soricidae and is endemic to China.

References

Mammals of China
Blarinella
Mammals described in 1872
Taxonomy articles created by Polbot